Menyaylovo is a rural locality (a selo) and the administrative center of Menyaylovskoye Rural Settlement, Alexeyevsky District, Belgorod Oblast, Russia. The population was 424 as of 2010. There are 10 streets.

Geography 
Menyaylovo is located 14 km south of Alexeyevka (the district's administrative centre) by road. Shaposhnikov is the nearest rural locality.

References 

Rural localities in Alexeyevsky District, Belgorod Oblast
Biryuchensky Uyezd